Jacob Spoonley (born 3 March 1987) is a New Zealand goalkeeper currently playing for Forrest Hill Milford.

Football career
In 2005, Spoonley played for Auckland City for two seasons. He left to the Wellington Phoenix in 2007 after a successful Under 20 World Cup in Canada.

He returned to Auckland City FC in late 2008 as the no. 1 choice for goalkeeper. Since returning to City he has helped them win three O-League titles in four seasons and has made two appearances at the FIFA Club World Cup, including in the 2014 edition where he stepped in for regular goalkeeper Tamati Williams to play in the third-place playoff against Cruz Azul, starring in a 4–2 shootout win after an initial 1–1 draw.

In October 2012, Spoonley was loaned to Wellington Phoenix for one week due to both regular keepers (Mark Paston and Glen Moss) being out on international duty. He played one game against Melbourne Heart, which was drawn 1–1. As a result of his performance he was voted as the goalkeeper in Fox Sports' team of the round.

International career
He was the 1st choice keeper for New Zealand's matches at the 2007 FIFA U-20 World Cup in Canada.

Spoonley was included in the New Zealand squad for the football tournament at the Summer Olympics in Beijing. He played in New Zealands 3 group matches against China (1–1), Brazil (0–5) and Belgium (0–1).

He made his New Zealand senior debut on 19 November 2008 in a 2–0 loss to Fiji after coming on as a substitute following the sending off of Glen Moss.

Broadcasting career 
From 2021, he became the analyst with fellow former New Zealand defender, Ivan Vicelich. for Sky Sports as New Zealand build up to 2022 World Cup Qualification.

International goals and caps
New Zealand's goal tally first.

International career statistics

References

External links
 
 Profile on the official Wellington Phoenix website

1987 births
Living people
New Zealand association footballers
New Zealand international footballers
Olympic association footballers of New Zealand
Association football goalkeepers
Wellington Phoenix FC players
Auckland City FC players
A-League Men players
New Zealand Football Championship players
Footballers at the 2008 Summer Olympics
2008 OFC Nations Cup players